Au Pair II (also known as Au Pair II: The Fairytale Continues) is a 2001 American made-for-television romantic comedy film starring Gregory Harrison and Heidi Lenhart and is the second installment in the Au Pair trilogy.

Synopsis
A year after the events of Au Pair, Jennifer Morgan, Oliver Caldwell, and his kids Katie and Alex are back in Europe as the couple prepare for the merger of Caldwell’s company and another named Tek Hausen.

Cassandra and Michael Hausen, the adult children of Tek Hausen’s founder, are opposed to the merger as they see it taking control of their father's company from them. They plot to ruin Caldwell's image and his engagement to Jennifer, in order to gain control of the combined companies.

Cast
 Gregory Harrison as Oliver Caldwell
 Heidi Lenhart as Jennifer "Jenny" Morgan
 Jake Dinwiddie as Alex Caldwell
 Katie Volding as Katie Caldwell
 Rachel York as Cassandra Hausen
 Robin Dunne as Michael Hausen
 June Lockhart as Grandma Nell Grayson
 James Lancaster as Seamus
 Cliff Bemis as Sam Morgan
 Celine Massuger as Brigitte Chabeaux, granddaughter to Karl Hausen and niece to Cassandra and Michael
 Rory Knox Johnston as Karl Hausen
 Jan Preucil as Grimaldi the Paparazzo
 Dan Brown as Reporter #1
 David O'Kelly as Reporter #2
 Jan Kuzelka as Chef

DVD release
Much like the original film, there has been a Region 4 release, there is yet to be a release for the United States and Europe.

Television release
In the USA, the movie is occasionally aired on Fox Family's successor, ABC Family/Freeform with the original. In previous airings there has been advertising on the network for a marathon special, and in recent airings, the films went from primetime slots to late daytime slots.

References

External links
 
 
 

Television sequel films
ABC Family original films
2001 romantic comedy films
2001 television films
2001 films
Films shot in the Czech Republic
Au pairs in films
Films scored by Inon Zur
Saban Entertainment films
Films directed by Mark Griffiths (director)
2000s English-language films